Diaphus faustinoi is a species of lanternfish found in the Philippines and the Western Central Pacific Ocean.

Etymology
The fish is named in honor of Leopoldo A. Faustino (1892-1935), a geologist, a mineralogist and a conchologist with the Bureau of Science, in Manila, Philippines,

References

Myctophidae
Taxa named by Henry Weed Fowler
Fish described in 1934